Darbhanga Public School is an Indian CBSE affiliated English medium co-educational school of the district (Darbhanga) and Mithila, established on 5 January 2000. The region has been an ancient seat of learning. The school was established by a team of people.

The students in the school are divided into four houses:

About the school 
The school has a history of over 15 years in the space of education.  It was started by a team of educationists The Darbhanga Public School is founded by Dr. Lal Mohan Jha who was the principal of C.M.Science College and ex-director of Women's Institute of Technology, who is currently chairman of the school. In last 18 years; the school has established itself as a premier education center of entire Mithilanchal. Over 2000 alumni of the school today are working across the globe.

Motto of the school 
Motto of the School is - “Manifestation of Perfection.”
The motto is derived from a famous quote of Swami Vivekananda – “Education is the manifestation of perfection already present in man”. Something is said to be manifested only when it finds an expression.

References

External links 

 

Education in Darbhanga
Educational institutions established in 2000
Private schools in Bihar
2000 establishments in Bihar
High schools and secondary schools in Bihar